Teasdale is a surname.

Teasdale may also refer to:
 Teasdale, Mississippi, United States
 Teasdale, Utah, United States
 Teasdale Corrie, an Antarctic cirque about 1,600 ft north-northeast of Cinder Spur
 Armstrong Teasdale based in St. Louis, Missouri, one of the state’s largest law firms